The Constitution of the Roman Kingdom was an unwritten set of guidelines and principles originating mainly through precedent. During the years of the Roman Kingdom, the constitutional arrangement was centered on the king, who had the power to appoint assistants, and delegate to them their specific powers. The Roman Senate, which was dominated by the aristocracy, served as the advisory council to the king. Often, the king asked the Senate to vote on various matters, but he was free to ignore any advice they gave him. The king could also request a vote on various matters by the popular assembly (the "Curiate Assembly"), which he was also free to ignore. The popular assembly functioned as a vehicle through which the People of Rome could express their opinions. In it, the people were organized according to their respective curiae. However, the popular assembly did have other functions. For example, it was a forum used by citizens to hear announcements. It could also serve as a trial court for both civil and criminal matters.

Constitutional history

The period of the kingdom can be divided into two epochs based on the legends. While the specific legends were probably not true, they were likely based on historical fact. It is likely that, before the founding of the republic, Rome had actually been ruled by a succession of kings. The first legendary epoch spans the reigns of the first four legendary kings. During this time, the political foundations of the city were laid, the city was organized into "curiae", the religious institutions were established, and the Senate and the assemblies evolved into formal institutions. The city fought several wars of conquest, the port of Ostia was founded, and the Tiber River was bridged. The early Romans were divided into three ethnic groups: the Ramnes (Latins), Tities (Sabines), and Luceres (Etruscans). The original "patrician" families belonged to these ethnic groups. In an attempt to add a level of organization to the city, these patrician families were divided into units called "curiae". The vehicle through which the early Romans expressed their democratic impulses was known as a "committee" (comitia or "assembly"). The two principal assemblies that formed were known as the "Curiate Assembly" and the "Calate Assembly". The two assemblies were designed to mirror the ethnic divisions of the city and, as such, the assemblies were organized according to curia. The vehicle through which the early Romans expressed their aristocratic impulses was a council of town elders, which became the Roman Senate. The elders of this council were known as patres ("fathers"), and thus are known to history as the first Roman senators. The populus ("people") and the elders eventually recognized the need for a single political leader, and thus elected the rex (king). The populus elected the rex, and the elders advised the rex.

The second epoch spans the reigns of the last three legendary kings. This epoch was more consequential than the first, which was due partly to the significant degree of territorial expansion that occurred. Regardless of whether these legends are true, it is likely that, as the legends claim, a series of conquests did occur during the late monarchy. As a result of these conquests, it became necessary to determine what was to be done with the conquered people. Often, some of the individuals whose towns had been conquered remained in those towns, while some others came to Rome. To acquire legal and economic standing, these newcomers adopted a condition of dependency toward either a patrician family, or toward the king (who himself was a patrician). Eventually, the individuals who were dependents of the king were released from their state of dependency, and became the first "plebeians". As Rome grew, it needed more soldiers to continue its conquests. When the plebeians were released from their dependency, they were released from their curiae. When this occurred, they were freed from the requirement to serve in the army, but they also lost their political and economic standing. To bring these new plebeians back into the army, the patricians were forced to make concessions. While it is not known exactly what concessions were made, the fact that they were not granted any political power set the stage for what history knows as the Conflict of the Orders.

To bring the plebeians back into the army, the army was reorganized. The legends give credit for this reorganization to King Servius Tullius. Per the legends, Tullius abolished the old system whereby the army was organized on the basis of the hereditary curiae, and replaced it with one based on land ownership. As part of his reorganization, two new types of unit were created; the army was divided into "centuries", and later reorganizations made the army more efficient through the use of "tribes". The centuries were organized on the basis of property ownership, and any individual, patrician or plebeian, could become a member of a century. These centuries formed the basis of a new assembly called the "Centuriate Assembly", though this assembly was not immediately granted any political powers. In contrast, four tribes were created that encompassed the entire city of Rome, and while new tribes were to be created later, those tribes would encompass territory outside of the city of Rome. Membership in a tribe, unlike that in a curia, was open to both patricians and plebeians without regard to property qualification.

Senate

The Roman Senate was a political institution starting in the ancient Roman Kingdom. The Latin term, "senātus," is derived from senex, which means "old man". Therefore, senate literally means "board of old men." The prehistoric Indo-Europeans that settled Italy in the centuries before the legendary founding of Rome in 753 BC were structured into tribal communities. These communities would often include an aristocratic board of tribal elders. The early Roman family was called a gens, or "clan". Each clan was an aggregation of families under a common living male patriarch, called a pater (Latin for "father"), who was the undisputed master of his clan. When the early Roman gentes were aggregating to form a community, the patres from the leading clans were selected for the confederated board of elders (which later became the Roman Senate). Over time, the patres came to recognize the need for a single leader. Therefore, they elected a Roman king (rex), and vested in him their sovereign power. When the king died, that sovereign power would naturally revert to the patres. The senate of the Roman Kingdom held three principal responsibilities: it functioned as the ultimate repository for the executive power, served as counsel to the king, and functioned as a legislative body in concert with the people of Rome.

 
During the years of the monarchy, the Senate's most important function was to select new kings. The period between the death of one king and the election of the next, was called an interregnum. When a king died, a member of the Senate (the "interrex"') would nominate a candidate to replace the king. After the Senate gave its initial approval of the nominee, he would then be formally elected by the people, and then receive the Senate's final approval. So while the king was officially elected by the people, it was effectively the Senate's decision. The Senate's most significant role outside of royal elections was as an advisory council to the king. While the king was not bound by the Senate's advice, the growing prestige of the Senate made its advice increasingly impolitic to ignore. Technically, the Senate could also make laws, though it would be incorrect to view the Senate's decrees as legislation in the modern sense. Only the king could decree new laws, although he would often involve both the Senate and the Curiate Assembly (the popular assembly) in the process.

Legislative Assemblies

The legislative assemblies were political institutions in the ancient Roman Kingdom. While one, the Curiate Assembly, had some legislative powers, these involved nothing more than a right to symbolically ratify decrees issued by the Roman King. The functions of the other, the Calate Assembly ("Comitia Calata"), were purely religious. During the years of the kingdom, all of the People of Rome were divided among a total of thirty curiae, the basic units of division in the two popular assemblies. The members in each curia would vote, and the majority therein would determine how that curia voted before the assembly. Thus a majority of the curiae (at least sixteen of the thirty) was needed during any vote in either the Curiate Assembly or the Calate Assembly.

The Curiate Assembly (Comitia Curiata) was the only popular assembly with any political significance during the period of the Roman Kingdom, and was organized on the basis of the thirty curiae. The king presided over the assembly, and submitted decrees to it for ratification. On the calends (the first day of the month), and the nones (the fifth or seventh day of the month), this assembly met to hear announcements. Appeals heard by the Curiate often dealt with questions concerning Roman family law. During two fixed days in the spring, the assembly was scheduled to meet to witness wills and adoptions. The assembly also had jurisdiction over the admission of new families to a curia, the transfer of families between two curiae, and the transfer of individuals from plebeian to patrician status (or vice versa).

Executive Magistrates 

Executive Magistrates were elected officials of the ancient Roman Kingdom. During the period of the Roman Kingdom, the king was the principal executive magistrate. He was the chief executive, chief priest, chief lawgiver, chief judge, and the commander in chief of the army. His powers rested on law and legal precedent, and he could only receive these powers through the political process of a democratic election. In practice, he had no real restrictions on his power. When war broke out, he had the sole power to organize and levy troops, to select leaders for the army, and to conduct the campaign as he saw fit. He controlled all property held by the state, had the sole power to divide land and war spoils, was the chief representative of the city during dealings with either the gods or the leaders of other communities, and could unilaterally decree any new law. Sometimes he submitted his decrees to either the popular assembly or to the Senate for a ceremonial ratification, but a rejection did not prevent the enactment of the decree. The king chose several officers to assist him, and unilaterally granted them their powers. When the king left the city, an "urban prefect" presided over the city in his stead. The king also had two quaestors as general assistants, while several other officers assisted the king during treason cases. In war, the king occasionally commanded only the infantry, and delegated command over the cavalry to the commander of his personal bodyguards, the tribune of the Celeres. The king sometimes deferred to precedent, often simply out of practical necessity. While the king could unilaterally declare war, for example, he typically wanted to have such declarations ratified by the popular assembly.

The period between the death of one king and the election of the next was known as an interregnum. During the interregnum, the Senate elected a senator to the office of interrex to facilitate the selection of a new king. Once the interrex found a suitable nominee for the kingship, he presented this nominee to the senate for an initial approval. If the Senate voted in favor of the nominee, that man (women were excluded as nominees) stood for formal election before the People of Rome in the Curiate Assembly (the popular assembly). After the nominee was elected by the Curiate, the Senate ratified the election by passing a decree. The interrex then formally declared the nominee to be king. The new king then took the auspices (a ritual search for omens from the gods), and was vested with legal authority (imperium) by the popular assembly.

The end of the monarchy

The first Etruscan King of Rome, Tarquinius Priscus, succeeded king Ancus Marcius. It has been suggested that Rome had been conquered by the Etruscans, but this is unlikely. The city was located in an easily defensible position, and its rapid growth attracted people from all over the region. The city's liberal policy of extending citizenship probably created an opportunity for a skillful leader to gain the throne. The reign of the first four kings was distinct from that of the last three. The first kings were elected. Between the reigns of the final three kings, however, the monarchy became hereditary, and thus the Senate became subordinated to the king. The fact that the monarchy became hereditary is obvious from the kinship among those three kings, as well as from the lack of interregna. The fact that the auspices did not revert to the Senate upon the deaths of those kings constituted a serious erosion of the Senate's authority, because it prevented the Senate from electing a monarch of its choosing. This violation of the Senate's sovereignty, rather than an intolerable tyranny, was probably what led the patricians in the Senate to overthrow the last king. The king may have sought the support of the plebeians, but the plebeians were no doubt exhausted from their continued military service and from their forced labor in the construction of public works, and were probably also embittered by their lack of political power. Therefore, they did not come to the aide of either the king or the Senate.

See also

 Roman Kingdom
 Roman Republic
 Roman Empire
 Roman Law
 Plebeian Council
 Centuria
 Curia
 Roman consul
 Praetor
 Roman censor
 Quaestor
 Aedile
 Roman Dictator
 Master of the Horse
 Roman Senate
 Cursus honorum
 Byzantine Senate
 Pontifex Maximus
 Princeps senatus
 Interrex
 Promagistrate
 Acta Senatus

Notes

References

 Abbott, Frank Frost (1901). A History and Description of Roman Political Institutions. Elibron Classics.
 Byrd, Robert (1995). The Senate of the Roman Republic. U.S. Government Printing Office, Senate Document 103-23.
 Cicero, Marcus Tullius (1841). The Political Works of Marcus Tullius Cicero: Comprising his Treatise on the Commonwealth; and his Treatise on the Laws. Translated from the original, with Dissertations and Notes in Two Volumes. By Francis Barham, Esq. London: Edmund Spettigue. Vol. 1.
 Lintott, Andrew (1999). The Constitution of the Roman Republic. Oxford University Press.

 Polybius (1823). The General History of Polybius: Translated from the Greek. By James Hampton. Oxford: Printed by W. Baxter. Fifth Edition, Vol 2.
 Taylor, Lily Ross (1966). Roman Voting Assemblies: From the Hannibalic War to the Dictatorship of Caesar. The University of Michigan Press.

Further reading 

 Ihne, Wilhelm. Researches Into the History of the Roman Constitution. William Pickering. 1853. 
 Johnston, Harold Whetstone. Orations and Letters of Cicero: With Historical Introduction, An Outline of the Roman Constitution, Notes, Vocabulary and Index. Scott, Foresman and Company. 1891.
 Mommsen, Theodor. Roman Constitutional Law. 1871-1888
 Tighe, Ambrose. The Development of the Roman Constitution. D. Apple & Co. 1886.
 Von Fritz, Kurt. The Theory of the Mixed Constitution in Antiquity. Columbia University Press, New York. 1975.
 The Histories by Polybius
 Cambridge Ancient History, Volumes 9–13.
 A. Cameron, The Later Roman Empire, (Fontana Press, 1993).
 M. Crawford, The Roman Republic, (Fontana Press, 1978).
 E. S. Gruen, "The Last Generation of the Roman Republic" (U California Press, 1974)
 F. Millar, The Emperor in the Roman World, (Duckworth, 1977, 1992).
 A. Lintott, "The Constitution of the Roman Republic" (Oxford University Press, 1999)

Primary sources 
 Cicero's De Re Publica, Book Two
 Rome at the End of the Punic Wars: An Analysis of the Roman Government; by Polybius

Secondary source material 
 Considerations on the Causes of the Greatness of the Romans and their Decline, by Montesquieu
 The Roman Constitution to the Time of Cicero
 What a Terrorist Incident in Ancient Rome Can Teach Us

Government of the Kingdom of Rome
Constitutions of ancient Rome